Yevgeniya Roppel (born 24 April 1976) is a Kyrgyzstani former biathlete. She competed in two events at the 1994 Winter Olympics. She was the first woman to represent Kyrgyzstan at the Olympics.

References

External links
 

1976 births
Living people
Biathletes at the 1994 Winter Olympics
Kyrgyzstani female biathletes
Olympic biathletes of Kyrgyzstan
Place of birth missing (living people)